.video is a generic top-level domain in the Domain Name System of the Internet. Its name suggests the intended use by producers, bloggers, videographers to showcase pod-casts to broadcasts, reach out and create an instant recall value.

References

Video

sv:Toppdomän#Generiska toppdomäner